Dr. Hilana Sedarous (Arabic: د./ هيلانا سيداروس) (born in Tanta, Egypt, 1904) was a Coptic Egyptian physician. She was the first woman to become a doctor in Egypt.

Education
After finishing her primary education, Hilana Sedarous enrolled at  "Madraset Al Saneyah" (a girls' boarding school in Cairo). She later went to a teacher training university, where after 2 years (in 1922), she received a scholarship and was sent with 5 other female Egyptian students to London to study mathematics. She, along with Zainab Kamel, were considered to be the first female Egyptian students to be sent to study in England. She also enrolled at  London School of Medicine, where she became a certified physician and finished her doctorate in 1930.

Career 
Dr. Sedarous returned to Egypt becoming the first female doctor in Egypt. She worked in Kitchener Hospital (Shoubra General Hospital), Cairo, carrying out her surgical procedures at the Coptic Hospital. She also opened a private clinic. She specialized in obstetrics and gynaecology.

Retirement 
Dr. Sedarous retired in her seventies. After retiring, she dedicated herself to translating stories and books for children. Dr. Sedarous was well known for her selflessness and generosity, and she had a soft spot for orphans and orphanages. She donated most of her massive wealth throughout her lifetime to all sorts of charitable causes.

Death 
Dr. Sedarous died of natural causes in 1998.

See also 
List of notable Egyptians
List of notable Copts

External links
SSS Kasr AlAiny
Coptic Medical Society UK

1904 births
1998 deaths
Egyptian Copts
Egyptian obstetricians and gynaecologists
People from Tanta
Egyptian women physicians
20th-century Egyptian physicians
20th-century women physicians
Women's rights